The 2023 BYU Cougars men's volleyball team represents Brigham Young University in the 2023 NCAA Division I & II men's volleyball season. The Cougars, led by eighth year head coach Shawn Olmstead, play their home games at Smith Fieldhouse. The Cougars are members of the MPSF. After finishing last season with a MPSF quarterfinal tournament loss, the Cougars were picked to finish sixth in the MPSF Pre-Season Poll.

Season highlights
Kupono Browne won the National Opposite of the Week award for Week 0 games.

Roster

Schedule
TV/Internet Streaming information:
All home games will be televised on BYUtv or BYUtv.org. Most road games will also be streamed by the schools streaming service. The conference tournament will be streamed by FloVolleyball.

 *-Indicates conference match.
 Times listed are Mountain Time Zone.

Announcers for televised games

McKendree: Jarom Jordan, Steve Vail, & Kenzie Koerber 
Lewis: Jarom Jordan, Steve Vail, & Kenzie Koerber
Fairleigh Dickinson: Jarom Jordan, Steve Vail, & Lauren McClain
Fairleigh Dickinson: Jarom Jordan, Steve Vail, & Lauren McClain
UC Irvine: Rob Espero & Charlie Brande 
UC Irvine: Rob Espero & Charlie Brande
Ball State: Lexi Eblen & Hudson French 
Ball State: Mick Tidrow, Amber Seaman, & Madison Surface  
UC Santa Barbara: Jarom Jordan, Kenzie Koerber, & Lauren McClain 
UC Santa Barbara: Jarom Jordan, Kenzie Koerber, & Lauren McClain; Guest Analyst: Kevin Barnett
UCLA: Brian Webber
UCLA: Denny Cline
Concordia Irvine: Alex Parisian
Concordia Irvine: Jeff Runyan & Alex Parisian
Grand Canyon: Houston Boe & Amanda Roach
Grand Canyon: 
Ohio State: 
Ohio State: 
Pepperdine: 
Pepperdine: 
USC: 
USC: 
Stanford: 
Stanford: 
MPSF Quarterfinal- :

Rankings 

^The Media does not release a Pre-season or Week 1 poll.

References

2023 in sports in Utah
2023 NCAA Division I & II men's volleyball season
2023 team
2023 Mountain Pacific Sports Federation volleyball season